Thirtysixstrings is the first album from Dublin-based instrumental band The Redneck Manifesto.

Track listing

References

2001 albums
The Redneck Manifesto (band) albums